BC Dinamo Tbilisi history and statistics in FIBA Europe and Euroleague Basketball (company) competitions.

European competitions

Record

References

External links
FIBA Europe
EuroLeague
ULEB
EuroCup